Gayle  is a variant spelling of Gail, a short form of the name Abigail.

Abigail is a feminine English name with Hebrew origins, meaning "my father is joy." In the Old Testament Abigail was King David's third wife, described as 'good in discretion and beautiful in form.  It is used in modern English and was a popular baby's name during the 1950s and '60s.

Gayle may occasionally be used as a masculine name.

Under popular names it was ranked #4902 most common last name in the 1990 census.

People with the given name Gayle
 Gayle Benson (born 1947), American businesswoman
 Gayle King (born 1954), American television personality and journalist
 Gayle McCormick (1948–2016), American singer, member of the band Smith
 Taylor Gayle Rutherford (known mononymously as GAYLE), American pop rock singer

References

English-language unisex given names
Feminine given names
Masculine given names